The 2023  Dallas Open was a men's tennis tournament played on indoor hard courts. It was the 2nd edition of the Dallas Open, and part of the ATP Tour 250 series on the 2023 ATP Tour. It took place at the Styslinger/Altec Tennis Complex in the city of Dallas, United States, between February 6–12, 2023.

Champions

Singles

  Wu Yibing def.  John Isner, 6–7(4–7), 7–6(7–3), 7–6(14–12)

Doubles

  Jamie Murray /  Michael Venus def.  Nathaniel Lammons /  Jackson Withrow, 1–6, 7–6(7–4), [10–7]

Points and prize money

Point distribution

Prize money 

*per team

Singles main draw entrants

Seeds 

 1 Rankings are as of 30 January 2023.

Other entrants 
The following players received wildcards into the main draw:
  Liam Krall
  Jack Sock 
  Denis Shapovalov

The following players received entry from the qualifying draw:
  Brandon Holt  
  Alex Rybakov 
  Zachary Svajda 
  Fernando Verdasco

The following player received entry as a lucky loser:
  Gabriel Diallo

Withdrawals 
  Jenson Brooksby → replaced by  Steve Johnson
  Taro Daniel → replaced by  Gabriel Diallo
  Kwon Soon-woo → replaced by  Michael Mmoh
  Jiří Lehečka → replaced by  Tseng Chun-hsin
  Brandon Nakashima → replaced by  Christopher Eubanks
  Reilly Opelka → replaced by  Wu Yibing
  Ben Shelton → replaced by  Denis Kudla

Doubles main draw entrants

Seeds 

1 Rankings as of 30 January 2023.

Other entrants 
The following pairs received wildcards into the doubles main draw:
  Mitchell Krueger /  Thai-Son Kwiatkowski
  Pranav Kumar /  Adam Neff

Withdrawals 
  Marcos Giron /  Brandon Nakashima → replaced by  Christopher Eubanks /  Marcos Giron 
  Reilly Opelka /  Ben Shelton → replaced by  Radu Albot /  Jordan Thompson

References

External links 
Tournament overview on ATP Tour website
Official website

Dallas Open
Dallas Open
Dallas Open
Dallas Open
Dallas Open (2022)